Daniel Astrain Egozkue (born 29 March 1948) is a Spanish retired footballer who played as a defender.

Club career
Born in Pamplona, Navarre, Astrain joined Athletic Bilbao in 1969, from local CD Oberena. He spent nearly three full seasons with the reserves, making his first competitive appearance with the first team on 16 January 1972 by playing the full 90 minutes in a 2–1 away win against RCD Español.

Astrain scored his first league goal for the Lions on 5 November 1972, but in a 2–3 loss at Real Zaragoza. He was regularly played the club since being promoted to the main squad, going on to eventually appear in 222 games all competitions comprised (four goals).

Astrain retired in 1980 at the age of 32, after one season in Segunda División with Real Oviedo.

Honours
Athletic Bilbao
Copa del Rey: 1972–73

References

External links

1948 births
Living people
Footballers from Pamplona
Spanish footballers
Association football defenders
La Liga players
Segunda División players
Tercera División players
CD Oberena players
Bilbao Athletic footballers
Athletic Bilbao footballers
Real Oviedo players